Yough Senior High School is a high school located in the southeastern region of Westmoreland County, Pennsylvania, USA (Parents of Students/Staff/Educators). The school is operated by the Yough School District. Students attend from the townships of Sewickley Township, Westmoreland County, Pennsylvania and South Huntingdon. Yough High School has graduating class sizes from 180 to 200.

References

External links
 

Public high schools in Pennsylvania
Schools in Westmoreland County, Pennsylvania